The six tripoints of Oklahoma are:

 8 Mile Corner – Oklahoma, Kansas, Colorado
 Preston Monument – Oklahoma, Colorado, New Mexico
 Texhomex – Oklahoma, New Mexico, Texas
 OKTXAR Corner – Oklahoma, Texas, Arkansas
 OKARMO Corner – Oklahoma, Arkansas, Missouri
 OKKAMO Tri-State Marker – Oklahoma, Kansas, Missouri

See also
Tri-state area

External links
 Tri State Corners in the United States by Jack Parsell (2002) – PDF Book

Borders of Oklahoma
Border tripoints